Finding Sarah (also named Finding Sarah: From Royalty to the Real World) is an American documentary television series on the Oprah Winfrey Network that debuted on June 12, 2011.

Premise
The series follows the daily life of Sarah, Duchess of York, as she rebuilds her life after her divorce from Prince Andrew, and following numerous financial and public troubles. Throughout the episodes she seeks advice from experts in different fields including Phil McGraw, Suze Orman, and Martha Beck to find out how she can improve her life. Highlights of the show included Sarah's journey through Canada's Arctic region during which she challenged her physical and mental stamina.

Episodes

References

2010s American documentary television series
2011 American television series debuts
2011 American television series endings
English-language television shows
Oprah Winfrey Network original programming